Harun Babunagari (1902–1986; often referred to as Buzurgo Saheb) was a Bangladeshi Deobandi Islamic scholar, Sufi and an exegete of the Quran. He was the founder and first Principal of Al-Jamiatul Islamiah Azizul Uloom Babunagar, one of the oldest Qawmi Madrasa in Bangladesh.

Early life and education 
Harun Babunagari was born in 1902, to a Bengali Muslim family in the village of Babunagar in Fatikchhari, Chittagong District. His father Sufi Azizur Rahman was the founder of Al-Jamiatul Ahlia Darul Ulum Moinul Islam in Hathazari, and traced his ancestry to Caliph Abu Bakr. Babunagari had three other siblings, most notably Amin, a former head of the Hadith studies department at Al-Jamiatul Islamiah Azizul Uloom Babunagar.

He completed his primary education at a primary school in Babunagar. He studied various subjects there, including Saadi Shirazi's Gulistan - the most influential Persian prose in history. His father, Sufi Azizur Rahman, used to also teach him the Quran at home. After completing his primary studies, Babunagari joined Al-Jamia al-Arabia Nasirul Islam in Nazirhat Bazar, which was founded by his father, who also taught there. He studied there up until Kafiya.

In Muharram 1341 AH (August/September 1922), Babunagari enrolled at Al-Jamiatul Ahlia Darul Ulum Moinul Islam in Hathazari, which was also founded by his father. Due to family circumstances, he only studied up until Dawra-e-Hadith (Masters) and only learning up until Jamat-e-Ula Mishkat Sharif. He later completed studying Sihah Sittah with his elder brother, Amin.

Career and Spirituality 
Following the death of his father Sufi Azizur Rahman in 1922, Babunagari decided to fulfill his dreams. At the age of only 22, he established Al-Jamiatul Islamiah Azizul Uloom Babunagar in 1924. He served as the madrasa's principal up until his death in 1986.

He also served as a murid to Zamiruddin Ahmad for 18 years. After the latter's death, he turned to Azizul Haq. During a gathering at the Hathazari eidgah, Haque stood up during Babunagari's speech and declared that he has given him permission of the four tariqa.

Personal life and Death 
Babunagari married Umme Salma and had five children. His eldest child, Muhibbullah Babunagari, succeeded his roles after his death. His daughter, Fatimah Khatun, was the mother of Junaid Babunagari.

He died on 18 August, 1986 at the Chittagong Medicare Clinic. His janaza was performed the next day, led by his son Muhibbullah Babunagari. He was subsequently buried at the Maqbara-e-Haruni in the southern part of his madrasa in Babunagar.

See more 
List of Deobandis

References 

20th-century Muslim scholars of Islam
Hanafi fiqh scholars
Deobandis
1924 births
1986 deaths
People from Fatikchhari Upazila
20th-century Bengalis
Bangladeshi Sunni Muslim scholars of Islam
Bangladeshi people of Arab descent